Dead Meadow is the debut studio album by American band Dead Meadow. It was released in 2000 by Tolotta Records on CD and by Planaria Records on LP. It was re-issued with an untitled bonus track in 2006 by Xemu Records. This album was recorded for only a couple hundred dollars in the band's practice space.

Track listing
 "Sleepy Silver Door" – 7:31
 "Indian Bones" – 6:39
 "Dragonfly" – 3:50
 "Lady" – 4:30
 "Greensky Greenlake" [Instrumental] – 4:33
 "Beyond the Fields We Know" – 9:31
 "At the Edge of the Wood" – 3:34
 "Rocky Mountain High" – 4:34
 "untitled" – 1:51 [bonus with re-issue]

References

2000 debut albums
Dead Meadow albums
Tolotta Records albums